Skin Deep is a 1922 silent film crime drama directed by Lambert Hillyer and starring Milton Sills and Florence Vidor. It was based on a novel, Lucky Damage, by Marc Edmund Jones.

The Film was remade in 1929 by Warner Brothers, First National's inheritor, as Skin Deep.

Cast
Milton Sills - Bud Doyle
Florence Vidor - Ethel Carter
Marcia Manon - Sadie Doyle
Charles Clary - James Carlson
Winter Hall - Dr. Langdon
Joe Singleton - Joe Culver
Frank Campeau - Boss McQuarg
Gertrude Astor - Mrs. Carlson
Muriel Dana - Baby Carlson (*aka Muriel Frances Dana)
B. H. DeLay - Aviator

Preservation status
Prints held by Filmmuseum Netherlands now EYE Institut and the Library of Congress.

References

External links
 Skin Deep at IMDb.com

1922 films
American silent feature films
Films directed by Lambert Hillyer
Films based on American novels
First National Pictures films
American black-and-white films
American crime drama films
1922 crime drama films
1920s American films
Silent American drama films